Yobie Bassoule (born December 24, 1988 in Pansiaka, Upper Volta) is a Burkinabé professional football player, who currently plays for A.C. Isola Liri.

Career

Juventus
Bassoule began his career in the Juventus youth setup, and graduated in 2009. He was promoted to the first team, but was instantly loaned out to A.C. Isola Liri where he joined teammate Luca Lagnese. He has made 1 league appearance since joining the Lega Pro club and was signed on permanent basis in January 2011. He joined in January 2012 from Italian side A.C. Isola Liri on loan to Belgian lower side Royal Boussu Dour Borinage.

Notes

External links
 

1988 births
Living people
Burkinabé footballers
Burkinabé expatriate footballers
Juventus F.C. players
Expatriate footballers in Italy
People from Centre-Ouest Region
A.C. Isola Liri players
Association football defenders
21st-century Burkinabé people
Francs Borains players